Interleukin-1 receptor-like 2 is a protein that in humans is encoded by the IL1RL2 gene.

The protein encoded by this gene is a member of the interleukin 1 receptor family. An experiment with transient gene expression demonstrated that this receptor was incapable of binding to interleukin 1 alpha and interleukin 1 beta with high affinity. This gene and four other interleukin 1 receptor family genes, including interleukin 1 receptor, type I (IL1R1), interleukin 1 receptor, type II (IL1R2), interleukin 1 receptor-like 1 (IL1RL1), and interleukin 18 receptor 1 (IL18R1), form a cytokine receptor gene cluster in a region mapped to chromosome 2q12.

References

Further reading